The Pan American Men's Junior Handball Championship was the official competition for junior men's national handball teams of Americas, and took place every two years. In addition to crowning the Pan American champions, the tournament also served as a qualifying tournament for the IHF Junior World Handball Championship. In 2018, the PATHF was folded and the tournament was replaced with the North American & Caribbean and South and Central American Men's Junior Handball Championships.

Summary

Medal table

Participating nations

References

 
Recurring sporting events established in 1993
Recurring sporting events disestablished in 2018
Pan-American Team Handball Federation competitions